Kjell Hilding "Tjalle" Bäckman (21 February 1934 – 9 January 2019) was a Swedish speed skater. He competed at the 1960 Winter Olympics in the 5000 m and 10000 m events and won a bronze medal in the 10000 m; all three medalists of that event broke the previous world record. Nationally he won four long-distance titles: in the 5000 m (1959, 1961) and 10000 m (1959, 1960).

References

External links

 skateresults

1934 births
2019 deaths
Swedish male speed skaters
Olympic speed skaters of Sweden
Speed skaters at the 1960 Winter Olympics
Olympic bronze medalists for Sweden
Sportspeople from Gothenburg
Olympic medalists in speed skating
Medalists at the 1960 Winter Olympics
20th-century Swedish people